La Dépêche is the name of several newspapers:

 La Dépêche du Midi, commonly known as La Dépêche, a French newspaper based in Toulouse
 La Dépêche marocaine, a former francophone newspaper published in Morocco 1905-1961
 La Dépêche tunisienne, a former francophone newspaper published in Tunisia
 La Dépêche de Tahiti, founded 1964